Walt Disney Elementary School is a historic elementary school building located at Levittown, Tullytown, Bucks County, Pennsylvania that is part of the Pennsbury School District. It was built between 1953 and 1955, with additions built in 1964 and 1967–1969.  The original section is a one-story, steel frame building faced in orange brick with a flat roof and reflective of the Modern Movement. It features large, multi-framed rectangular windows with aluminum sashes. The first addition was for a library and the second for a two-story classroom and larger library.  It was renovated in 2005–2006.  The school was built to accommodate the growing population with the development of Levittown and dedicated on September 24, 1955.  The dedication was attended by its namesake Walt Disney (1901-1966).

It was added to the National Register of Historic Places in 2007.

References

School buildings on the National Register of Historic Places in Pennsylvania
Architecture in Pennsylvania
School buildings completed in 1969
Schools in Bucks County, Pennsylvania
National Register of Historic Places in Bucks County, Pennsylvania